The Remixes may refer to:

Albums 
 The Remixes (Ari Gold album), 2005
 The Remixes (Britt Nicole album), 2015
 The Remixes (Danii Minogue album), 1999
 The Remixes (Elvis Crespo album), 1999
 The Remixes (Every Little Thing album), 1997
 The Remixes (G.M.S. album), 2003
 The Remixes (Groove Armada album), 2000
 The Remixes (Mariah Carey album), 2003
 The Remixes (Shakira album), 1997
 The Remixes (The Stone Roses album), 2000
 INXS²: The Remixes, 2004

EPs 
 The Remixes (Anna Vissi EP), 2003
 The Remixes (SWV EP), 1994
 The Remixes (White Lies EP), 2010
 The Remixes (My Dear Disco EP), 2010
 The Remixes, by The Number Twelve Looks Like You, 2008

See also 
 Remixes (disambiguation)
 Remix (disambiguation)